Brunei Darussalam competes in the Southeast Asian Games since the 1977 edition of the games in Kuala Lumpur, Malaysia where they won their first 3 Bronze Medals. Brunei hosted and competed in the 1999 Southeast Asian Games in Bandar Seri Begawan and finished tenth in the overall total rankings with 4 Gold Medals, 12 Silver Medals and 31 Bronze Medals and is their current best performance in the games.

Medal tally

Medal summary

Medal by sport

References